Estonian Football Winter Tournament (EJL Taliturniir) is a pre-season tournament for clubs from Estonia.

The tournament is meant as a preseason training. By the current rules, no winner is declared and a tournament table is not kept.

Tournaments by year

References

External links
Home page
Winter Tournament on the soccerway.com

 
Winter